Wilson is an 'L' station on the CTA's Red and Purple Lines, located at 4620 North Broadway in the Uptown neighborhood of Chicago, Illinois.

History

The station opened on May 31, 1900, as the northern terminus of the Northwestern Elevated Railroad. It was converted to a two level station in 1907, with a loop track to aid turning trains.

The extended right-of-way allowed for a retail structure partially beneath the elevated tracks, which was designed by Frank Lloyd Wright in 1909, known as the Stohr Arcade Building. This structure only lasted until razing in 1922. The Stohr Arcade Building included "design themes that are reminiscent of the Robie House designed three years earlier".

The previous station building, known as the Gerber Building, was built in 1923, shortly after the tracks to the north were elevated; the McJunkin Building across was then used to access the Lower station platforms. Over the years the station has been extensively reconfigured: the lower level was closed on August 1, 1949; the platforms were reconfigured in 1960; and the North Shore Line—which also used the station—ceased operation in 1963, enabling the station layout to be simplified. 

A yard and shops were built adjacent to the station in 1901, these continued in use until the Howard Yard was expanded in 1993. The shop building was badly damaged in a fire on October 26, 1996, and the site was cleared soon after. This site remained empty for several years with plans for development in place. As of 2011, an Aldi store, a Target store, and residences now occupy this area.

Stub track
An elevated stub line from the station is a remnant of a connection into the former Buena Interchange Yard, where freight was exchanged with the Chicago, Milwaukee and St. Paul Railway. The CTA stopped carrying freight in the early 1970s and the stub was demolished south of Montrose Avenue. The Lakewood Avenue branch of the Chicago, Milwaukee & St. Paul Railway is now operated by the Soo Line Railroad, but no longer exists north of Diversey Avenue. In 2010, further demolition split the remaining stub into two sections to allow for new Truman College construction.

Wilson Station Reconstruction Project

The CTA's 2004–2008 Capital Improvement Plan included plans to reconstruct the station starting in 2008. In 2012, the CTA began planning to reconstruct the station to create a transfer point between Red and Purple Line Express trains (the only one since express service was discontinued in 1976).  The rebuilt station has a new main station entrance on the south side of Wilson, elevators, escalators, wider stairwells, additional turnstiles, new lights, new signage, additional bike parking, new security cameras, new train trackers, two island platforms to provide cross platform transfers between the two lines, and two auxiliary entrances: one at Sunnyside Avenue and one on the north side of Wilson. Demolition work for the project began in October 2014 and a groundbreaking ceremony was held on December 8, 2014. The station remained open during reconstruction.

Demolition of track 1 (the western track) began during the weekend of March 6, 2015. As a result, southbound Purple Line Express trains shared the same track with southbound Red Line trains and stopped at Wilson, Sheridan, and Addison in the AM rush hour only. This phase lasted for one year which ended with the activation of the new track 1 and new southbound platform.

Demolition of track 2 began on March 21, 2016. Temporary entrances opened on the same day and will remain open until completion of reconstruction. In addition, the western half of the new southbound platform opened for southbound Red Line and AM rush hour Purple Line Express trains, with Purple Line Express trains bypassing Addison station once again. Northbound Red Line trains continued to use the old platform, and the western half of the old Red Line platform closed.

Demolition of track 3 and the start of construction for a new northbound platform and new stationhouse began on September 26, 2016. The remaining half of the southbound platform reopened and the old platform used by Red Line trains closed. Northbound Red Line trains will stop on the eastern half of the southbound platform until the end of the project.

Demolition of track 4 started on March 13, 2017. This phase was completed on September 20, 2017. The east platform and the auxiliary entrance on the north side of Wilson opened for service on October 23, 2017. The auxiliary entrance on Sunnyside Avenue opened for service on December 1, 2017.

On February 5, 2018, The CTA announced the completion of the project.

Red and Purple Modernization
Starting in May 2021, the two northbound (eastern) tracks were taken out of service so the structure carrying those tracks could be rebuilt north of the station, with all trains running on the usual southbound (western tracks). In 2022, the northbound tracks will re-enter service and the southbound tracks will be taken out of service.

Facilities
The station has two island platforms serving four tracks. Red Line trains stop on the inside tracks, while Purple Line Express trains stop on the outside tracks during weekday rush hours.

Location
The station is located in the Uptown neighborhood at 4620 North Broadway in Chicago, Illinois (directional coordinates 4600 north, 1100 west). It is the closest station to Harry S Truman College.

Bus connections
CTA
36 Broadway
78 Montrose
81 Lawrence

Notes and references

Notes

References

External links 

 Wilson Station Page at Chicago-'L'.org
 Train schedule (PDF) at CTA official site
Wilson Station Page CTA official site
Broadway Avenue Primary Entrance from Google Maps Street View
Wilson Avenue auxiliary entrance from Google Maps Street View

CTA Red Line stations
CTA Purple Line stations
Railway stations in the United States opened in 1900
Former North Shore Line stations
Frank Lloyd Wright buildings